More Kiss Me! is a 1992 remix album by Australian pop group, Indecent Obsession. It was initially a Japan-only release, but was later released in South Africa after
Indecent Obsession became the first Western act to tour the country after the lifting of the cultural isolation of that nation due to their apartheid policy. McFarlane describes how the group were "greeted by screaming fans and scenes of mass hysteria". Both "Kiss Me" and "Indio" peaked at No. 1 on the relevant South African charts.

The album includes five versions of "Kiss Me" which was the lead single from the album Indio, released a month earlier.

The album was released digitally in July 2013.

Track listing
 "Kiss Me" (Junior Rock Dance - MC Pro) - 6:16
 "Maybe You" (Embassy Mix)	- 5:34
 "Mystery" - 3:51
 "Kiss Me" (Curt's Dub) - 5:13
 "Indio" (Rhythm Mix) - 3:42
 "Kiss Me" (Alt'7 Ambient Mix / No Fade-Need Time) - 5:13
 "Gentlemen Style" (Verse Ending)	- 3:55
 "Kiss Me" (Hip Rock Dub) - 5:08
 "Rebel With a Cause" (Son Of Mondo Mix) - 4:55
 "Whispers in the Dark" (AC Mix) - 5:08
 "Kiss Me" (Dub Me) - 5:09
 "Rebel With A Cause" (Mondo Mix) [South African version only]
 "Indio" (Chunky Mix) [South African version only]

References

External links
 "More Kiss Me!" by Indecent Obsession at Discogs

1992 remix albums
Indecent Obsession albums